Daniel J. Browne (born June 24, 1975) is an American distance runner. He has won numerous major American road race championships and was a member of the 2004 Olympic team in the 10 km and marathon.

Education
Brown attended West Linn High School, a suburb of Portland, Oregon, graduating in 1993. He graduated from The United States Military Academy with a major in Spanish & Portuguese and a minor in Systems engineering in 1997.

Running career
Browne first took running seriously while in high school.  He attended the United States Military Academy as a member of the class of 1997.  While at West Point, he became the only cadet to ever run a mile under four minutes (3:59.37), and set school records in the 3,000, 5,000 and 10,000 meters, which remain unbroken 10 years later. Upon graduating from West Point, he underwent basic officer training before being invited to joint the Army's World Class Athlete Program.  He moved to Colorado and trained full-time while serving his service commitment in the Colorado National Guard. He won the short course race at the 1998 USA Cross Country Championships. He was later approached by legendary running coach Alberto Salazar about joining the Nike Oregon Project.  He now splits time between training Chula Vista, California and living in Oregon.  Browne is sponsored by Nike. He made the US Olympic team in 2004 at 10,000 M and Marathon, finishing 3rd in both distances at the trials. He was unsuccessful in a bid to make the 2008 Olympic team.  He again attempted to make the 2012 Olympic team in the marathon, but was unsuccessful, completing the race as the last place finisher.

Personal bests

International competitions

Road races

References

External links 

 Dan Browne's Official Website (Internet Archive)

1975 births
Living people
Track and field athletes from Portland, Oregon
Athletes (track and field) at the 1999 Pan American Games
Athletes (track and field) at the 2003 Pan American Games
Athletes (track and field) at the 2004 Summer Olympics
Olympic track and field athletes of the United States
United States Military Academy alumni
American male long-distance runners
American male marathon runners
Sportspeople from Chula Vista, California
Pan American Games medalists in athletics (track and field)
Pan American Games bronze medalists for the United States
Universiade medalists in athletics (track and field)
Universiade silver medalists for the United States
Universiade bronze medalists for the United States
World Athletics Championships athletes for the United States
Medalists at the 1997 Summer Universiade
Medalists at the 2003 Pan American Games
Military personnel from California